Marek Ługowski (born 8 May 1964) is a former Polish footballer and international.

Football

He started his career with his local club Włókniarz Starogard Gdański, before moving across town to play for Wierzyca Starogard Gdański. In 1985 Ługowski joined Lechia Gdańsk spending 9 seasons with the club, playing 273 games and scoring 14 goals for the club. He currently features joint fifth on the list for all time appearance makers for Lechia. After his time with Lechia he moved to German club CfB Ford Köln Niehl eV. 

During his career Ługowski played twice for Poland, with both games coming in 1987. He made his debut against Norway with the other cap coming against Romania.

References

1964 births
Living people
Lechia Gdańsk players
Polish footballers
Poland international footballers
Association football midfielders
Polish expatriate footballers
Sportspeople from Pomeranian Voivodeship